Qu County or Quxian is a county in the northeast of Sichuan Province, China. It is the westernmost county-level division of the prefecture-level city of Dazhou.

History
Formerly known as Dangqu, the county is best known for historic monuments. Namely, a partially preserved mausoleum complex, featuring gate towers, or que, belonging to the Shen family, which dates back to the Han Dynasty.

From 2014 to 2018, the Han dynasty site of Chengba (城坝遗址) near Tuxi in Qu county was excavated. A number of eave tiles with Chinese characters "dangqu" (宕渠) have been found, leading archaeologists to believe that this was the site of the Han dynasty city of Dangqu.

Climate
Qu County has a monsoon-influenced humid subtropical climate (Köppen Cwa).

Notes

 
County-level divisions of Sichuan
Dazhou